L'assassino è ancora tra noi (English: The Killer is Still Among Us) is a 1986 Italian horror film written and directed by Camillo Teti, and co-written by Ernesto Gastaldi and Giuliano Carnimeo. It is loosely based on the crimes of the Italian serial killer known as "the Monster of Florence".

Plot 

A couple drives to a secluded lovers' lane on the outskirts of Florence to have sex. Both of them are gunned down by a gloved prowler, who then uses a knife and a tree branch to sexually mutilate the body of the female victim. The double homicide is the latest in a series of similar killings, perpetrated by an individual dubbed "Il Mostro" (The Monster). Christiana Marelli, a criminology student, is researching the serial killer for her thesis, to the dismay of her professor, the local police, and her doctor boyfriend, Alex.

As Christiana investigates Il Mostro, she begins receiving strange telephone calls, and finds herself being shadowed by a stalker, who at one point attempts to break into her apartment while she is home alone. A bartender who had offered to meet with Christiana to provide her with information is later found hanged, and Christiana begins to suspect that her boyfriend is Il Mostro due to a combination of mounting circumstantial evidence, Alex's conspicuous absences during all of the murders, and the fact that she had told him about her planned rendezvous with the bartender shortly before he was found dead.

After a couple whom she knew personally is murdered by Il Mostro, Christiana attends a séance in the hope that it can summon the victims' spirits, and shed light on the killer's identity; she drops Alex off at a theatre showing a Hitchcock film along the way. During the ceremony, the medium has a vision of Il Mostro killing and butchering another couple while they are camping; when the male victim's throat is slashed, a similar wound appears on the medium's neck. Now paranoid and convinced that Alex is the killer, Christiana leaves the séance and rushes back to the theatre; she is relieved to find him there, quietly watching the movie with the other spectators. As she makes her way to the seat next to him, an unseen figure approaches her and settles into the seat opposite hers. A title card then appears on the film they are watching: "The killer is still among us."

The end credits are preceded by a message that the film was made as a warning to young people, and with the hope of assisting the police in apprehending the real-life murderers.

Cast 

 Mariangela D'Abbraccio as Christiana Marelli
 Giovanni Visentin as Doctor Alex
 Riccardo Parisio Perrotti as Professor
 Luigi Mezzanotte as Doctor Franco M. Benincasa
 Yvonne D'Abbraccio as Chiara
 Francesco Capitano
 Oresto Antonio Rotundo as Commissioner
 Silvia D'Agostini
 Fabio Carfora as Birri
 Franco Adducci
 Marco Bertini
 Anna Pera
 Giuseppe Pelli
 M. Rosario Tizzano
 Roberto Sanna as Medium

Reception 

L'assassino è ancora tra noi was derisively deemed "incredibly boring" by Moviefone's Alison Nastasi, who went to say that while the film did have "a few disturbing scenes" they were not enough to save it from the "banal dialogue" and "bad characters" that made it "a one way trip to dullsville".

References

External links 

 

1986 films
1986 horror films
1986 independent films
1980s mystery films
1980s serial killer films
1980s supernatural films
1980s exploitation films
Giallo films
Horror films based on actual events
Italian horror films
Italian independent films
1980s Italian-language films
Italian mystery films
Italian slasher films
Films about stalking
Films about psychic powers
Films set in Florence
Films set in forests
Films shot in Tuscany
Self-reflexive films
Italian splatter films
Crime horror films
Mystery horror films
Supernatural slasher films
Italian supernatural horror films
Crime films based on actual events
Works about unsolved crimes
1986 directorial debut films
Films scored by Detto Mariano
1980s Italian films